João Sousa won the title, defeating Javier Martí 6–4, 0–6, 6–4 in the final.

Seeds

Draw

Finals

Top half

Bottom half

References
 Main Draw
 Qualifying Draw

Mersin Cup - Singles
2012 Singles